Ikari may refer to:

People with the surname
, Japanese swimmer
Yasukazu Ikari, Japanese astronomer

Entertainment

Anime
Misae Ikari, a Paranoia Agent character
Neon Genesis Evangelion characters: 
Shinji Ikari
Gendo Ikari
Yui Ikari

Film
 Rage (2016 film)

Videogames
Ikari Warriors
Victory Road, sequel to Ikari Warriors
Ikari III: The Rescue, sequel to Victory Road

Japanese-language surnames